Gokul Anand is an Indian actor who works in Tamil-language stage plays, films and web series. He debuted as a lead actor with the Tamil movie, Chennai 2 Singapore (2017).

Career 
As a child, he acted in Malayalam-language television shows, before joining the television group, The Boardwalkers. In a review of Micheal Muthu's stage play An Idiot for Dinner, a critic wrote that "Gokul Anand, as the frustrated Sanjay Kelavkar, put on a grand show which went above and beyond as his eyes glazed over in pain and anguish painted his face due to the antics of Gopu". He also starred in the play Moulin Rouge. He auditioned for several films before meeting M. Ghibran who told him about the film Chennai 2 Singapore. In a review of Chennai 2 Singapore by The Hindu, a critic noted that "Besides the film’s at-times-enjoyable treatment, the lead actor Gokul Anand is a good find for Tamil cinema. He is good-looking and comfortable in front of the camera".

Filmography

Films

Web series

References

External links 

Living people
Indian male film actors
21st-century Indian male actors
Male actors in Tamil cinema
Actors in Tamil theatre
Male actors in Malayalam television
Tamil male television actors
Year of birth missing (living people)